The SHG Black Point (also known as S.H.G. Black Point, commonly abbreviated as Black Point, stylized in lowercase in its logo) is a second-generation home video game console that was released in 1982 by Süddeutsche Elektro-Hausgeräte GmbH & Co. KG (SHG for short) only in Germany for 168 Deutsche Mark (DM).

The system comes with two detachable game controllers with one analog joystick and one fire button each. On the console, there are 10 buttons to select the games which came on ROM cartridges. There is also a difficulty switch, an on/off switch and a start button on the housing of the console. There are two models of the console: The FS-1003 and the FS-2000. Both models have the name SHG Black Point.

It is the successor of the SHG Black Point Multicolor FS 1001, released in 1977.

Technical specifications 

 Input devices: Two detachable analog game controllers and buttons on the console
 CPU: N/A
 RAM: N/A
 Power supply: 15 V, 120 mA (FS-1003)/9-11 V, 90 mA or 6 x 1.5 V batteries (FS-2000)
 Colors? Yes.
 Sound? Yes.

Games 
There are 7 or 8 games officially known to be released for the system which came on ROM cartridges. Like the Palladium Tele-Cassetten Game and many other consoles, the SHG Black Point uses PC-50X cartridges. The cartridges are also compatible with the Audio Sonic Programmable Video System and the Hanimex HMG 1292 home video game consoles. The games were sold for around 50 to 80 DEM. (About 50 to 75 € in 2020.) The console itself did not contain a CPU or any RAM, but the cartridges did. A module with 10 different variations of Pong was included in the scope of delivery.

List of known games 
Zehn elektronische Fernsehspiele in Farbe (Ten Color Electronic TV Games)
Grand Prix
Motorradrennen (Motorcycle Race)
Seekrieg (Naval War)
Panzerschlacht (Tank Battle)
1000-Treffer-Spiel (1000 Hit Game)
Schützenspiel (Shooter Game)

External links 

 SHG Black Point on www.old-computers.com
 Website with images of the SHG Black Point
 Another website with images
 Commercial flyer
 Instruction manual
 SHG Black Point on MobyGames

References 

Computer-related introductions in 1982
Home video game consoles
Second-generation video game consoles
Products introduced in 1982
1982 in video gaming
Europe-exclusive video games
Video games developed in Germany